Li Chun or Lichun may refer to:

People

Given name "Chun" surname "Li"
Emperor Xianzong of Tang (778–820), personal name Li Chun, emperor of the Tang dynasty
Li Chun (warlord) (1867–1920), Chinese general
Li Chun (actress) (born 1988), Chinese actress
Li Qinyao (born 1988), birth name Li Chun, Chinese actress
Li Zhun (1928–2000), Chinese writer, formerly romanized as Li Chun
Mason Lee (李淳; born 1990), Taiwanese-American actor

Places
Lichun, Sichuan, a town in Pengzhou, Sichuan, China

Other topics
Lichun, a solar term in East Asian Calendars
And the Spring Comes, a 2007 Chinese film by Gu Changwei

See also

 
 
, a South Korean submarine
Chun-Li, a character from the video game, Street Fighter
Chun Li (disambiguation)
Chun (disambiguation)
Li (disambiguation)